Mozart's Sister (French title: Nannerl, la sœur de Mozart) is a 2010 French drama film written and directed by René Féret, and starring two of his daughters. It presents a fictional account of the early life of Maria Anna Mozart, nicknamed Nannerl, who was the sister of Wolfgang Amadeus Mozart and his only sibling to survive infancy.

Plot
During the Mozart family grand tour, a cracked carriage axle forces Leopold Mozart, his wife Anna, 14-year-old Nannerl and a rambunctious 11-year-old Wolfgang to seek shelter in the nearby Fontevraud Abbey. There Nannerl develops a friendship with 13-year-old Princess Louise of France, who is being brought up in the Abbey, along with two of her sisters. This leads to an encounter at Versailles with her brother, Louis, Dauphin of France. Nannerl, an accomplished harpsichordist and singer who helps support the family as part of a brother/sister act, yearns to compose music and play violin, but her father, Leopold, forbids it. The young, but recently widowed Dauphin takes an interest in her and her music that edges toward romance. But he breaks off the relationship when he becomes engaged to Maria Josepha of Saxony, Dauphine of France. Princess Louise enters a convent and urges Nannerl to stay away from the Dauphin who is struggling to avoid the debauchery of his father, King Louis XV. A bizarre final encounter with the Dauphin and his new wife ensues. Nannerl and Princess Louise reflect on how their fates would have differed had they been born male.

Cast
  as Nannerl Mozart
 Marc Barbé as Leopold Mozart
  as Anna Maria Mozart
  as Wolfgang Mozart
  as Le Dauphin
 Lisa Féret as Louise de France
 Adèle Leprêtre as Victoire de France
 Dominique Marcas as Abbess
 Salomé Stévenin as Isabelle d'Aubusson
 Nicolas Giraud as Master of Music at Versailles

Reception
Mozart's Sister received generally positive reviews, holding a 75% rating on Rotten Tomatoes. On Metacritic, which uses an average of critics' reviews, the film has 71/100, indicating "generally favorable reviews".

Home video
In the United States, Mozart's Sister was released on DVD and Blu-ray Disc by Music Box Films. Each DVD and Blu-ray Disc includes a music CD with the film's soundtrack, composed by Marie-Jeanna Serero. The music CD's tracks are:

Le Voyage
Louise de France
Concert a l'abbaye
Le livre maudit
Tendresse
Le Violon du Dauphin
Le Do Magique
Versailles
Le Voyage
La Gifle
Chant Versailles
Improvisation
Dauphin Lettre 1
La Mer
Nannerl compose
Concert Nannerl – 1st movement
Concert Nannerl – 2nd movement
Concert Nannerl – 3rd movement
Dauphin Lettre 2
Comptine Leopold
Le Catafalque
Dernier repas
Nannerl brule ses partitions
Generique de fin

References

External links
 
 

2010 films
2010 biographical drama films
Films directed by René Féret
2010s French-language films
Films about classical music and musicians
Films set in France
Films set in the 1760s
Films shot in France
French independent films
French biographical drama films
Films about Wolfgang Amadeus Mozart
2010 drama films
2010 independent films
2010s French films